James Allen Asher (born October 31, 1972) is a former American football tight end who played for the Washington Redskins and Philadelphia Eagles in the National Football League  He played high school football at Warren Central High School in Indianapolis. He played college football at the University of Louisville and was drafted in the fifth round of the 1995 NFL Draft with the 137th overall pick.

References

1972 births
Living people
Louisville Cardinals football players
Washington Redskins players
Philadelphia Eagles players
Players of American football from Indianapolis
American football tight ends